This is a list of countries by urban population.

List

See also
List of countries and dependencies by population
Urbanization by sovereign state

Sources

Urban population by country 2017 World Bank Data
Urban population (most recent) by country

References

Urban population
World population